The Caylus vase is a jar in alabaster dedicated in the name of the Achaemenid king Xerxes I in Egyptian hieroglyph and Old Persian cuneiform. It was the key element in confirming the decipherment of Old Persian cuneiform by Grotefend, through the reading of the hieroglyphic part by Champollion in 1823. It also confirmed the antiquity of phonetical hieroglyphs before the time of Alexander the Great, thus corroborating the phonetical decipherment of the names of ancient Egyptian pharaohs. The vase was named after Anne Claude de Tubières, count of Caylus, an early French collector, who had acquired the vase in the 18th century, between 1752 and 1765. It is now located in the Cabinet des Médailles, Paris (inv. 65.4695).

Description
The vase is made in alabaster, with a height of 29.2 cm, and a diameter of 16 cm. Several similar vases, probably made in Egypt in the name of Xerxes I, have since been found, such as the Jar of Xerxes I, found in the ruins of the Mausoleum at Halicarnassus.

The vase has a quadri-lingual inscription, in Old Persian, Babylonian, and Elamite cuneiforms, and in Egyptian hieroglyphs. All three inscriptions have the same meaning "Xerxes : The Great King". The Old Persian cuneiform inscription in particular, comes first in the series of languages, and reads:

The line in Egyptian hieroglyph has the same meaning, and critically uses the cartouche for the name of Xerxes.

The vase remained undeciphered for a long time after its acquisition by Caylus, but Caylus had already announced in 1762, in his publication of the vase, that the inscription combined the Egyptian script with the cuneiform script found in the monuments of Persepolis. Upon Caylus's death in 1765, the vase was given to the Cabinet des Médailles collection in Paris.

Contribution to the decipherment of cuneiform

Grotefend hypothesis (1802-1815)
The early attempts at deciphering Old Persian cuneiform were made by Münter and Grotefend by guesswork only, using Achaemenid cuneiform inscriptions found in Persepolis. In 1802, Friedrich Münter realized that recurring groups of characters must be the word for "king" (now known to be pronounced xšāyaθiya). Georg Friedrich Grotefend extended this work by realizing a king's name is often followed by "great king, king of kings" and the name of the king's father. This, related to the known chronology of the Achaemenid and the relative sizes of each royal names, allowed Grotefend to figure out the cuneiform characters that are part of Darius, Darius's father Hystaspes, and Darius's son Xerxes. Grotefend's contribution to Old Persian is unique in that he did not have comparisons between Old Persian and known languages, as opposed to the decipherment of Egyptian hieroglyphs and the Rosetta Stone. All his decipherments were done by comparing the texts with known history.

Grotefend presented his deductions in 1802, but they were dismissed by the Academic community, and denied publication. Grotefend has proposed a reading of the cuneiform inscriptions on the Caylus vase since 1805, translating it quite accurately as "Xerxes rex fortis" ("Xerxes, the Strong King", although it is actually "Xerxes, the Great King"). He was the first to make this suggestion.

Champollion decipherment and confirmation (1823)

It was only in 1823 that Grotefend's discovery was confirmed, when Jean-François Champollion, who had just deciphered hieroglyphs, had the idea of trying to decrypt the quadrilingual hieroglyph-cuneiform inscription on a famous alabaster vase in the Cabinet des Médailles, the "Caylus vase". The Egyptian inscription on the vase turned out to be in the name of King Xerxes I, and the orientalist Antoine-Jean Saint-Martin, who accompanied Champollion, was able to confirm that the corresponding words in the cuneiform script (𐎧𐏁𐎹𐎠𐎼𐏁𐎠 𐏐 𐏋 𐏐 𐎺𐏀𐎼𐎣,  Xšayāršā : XŠ : vazraka, "Xerxes : The Great King") were indeed using the words which Grotefend had identified as meaning "king" and "Xerxes" through guesswork.  The findings were published by A.J. Saint-Martin in Extrait d'un mémoire relatif aux antiques inscriptions de Persépolis lu à l'Académie des Inscriptions et Belles Lettres. Saint-Martin attempted to define an Old Persian cuneiform alphabet, of which 10 letters were correct, on a total of 39 signs he had identified.

The Caylus vase was key in confirming the validity of the first decipherments of Old Persian cuneiform, and opened the door to the subsequent decipherment of all cuneiform inscriptions as far back as the oldest Akkadian and Sumerian inscriptions. In effect the decipherment of Egyptian hieroglyphs was decisive in confirming the first steps of the decipherment of the cuneiform script.

More advances were made on Grotefend's work and by 1847, most of the symbols were correctly identified. The decipherment of the Old Persian Cuneiform script was at the beginning of the decipherment of all the other cuneiform scripts, as various multi-lingual inscriptions between the various cuneiform scripts were obtained form archaeological discoveries. The decipherment of Old Persian was notably useful to the decipherment of Elamite, Babylonian and ultimately Akkadian (predecessor of Babylonian), through the multi-lingual Behistun Inscription.

Confirmation of the antiquity of phonetical hieroglyphs

Champollion had been confronted to the doubts of various scholars regarding the existence of phonetical hieroglyphs before the time of the Greeks and the Romans in Egypt, especially since Champollion had only proved his phonetic system on the basis of the names of Greek and Roman rulers found in hieroglyphs on Egyptian monuments. Until his decipherment of the Caylus vase, he hadn't found any foreign names earlier than Alexander the Great that were transliterated through alphabetic hieroglyphs, which led to suspicions that they were invented at the time of the Greeks and Romans, and fostered doubts whether phonetical hieroglyphs could be applied to decipher the names of ancient Egyptian Pharaos. For the first time, here was a foreign name ("Xerxes the Great") transcribed phonetically with Egyptians hieroglyphs, already 150 years before Alexander the Great, thereby essentially proving Champollion's thesis. In his Précis du système hiéroglyphique published in 1824, Champollion wrote of this discovery: "It has thus been proved that Egyptian hieroglyphs included phonetic signs, at least since 460 BCE".

Similar jars

A few similar alabaster jar exist, from the time of Darius I to Xerxes, and to some later Achaemenid rulers, especially Artaxerxes I.

References

Archaeology of the Achaemenid Empire
Xerxes I
Achaemenid inscriptions
Akkadian inscriptions
Elamite language
Alabaster
Egyptian inscriptions
Individual vases